Francis McEldowney (born 24 April 1981) is a dual player of Gaelic games who plays Gaelic football for the Derry county team, with whom he won a National League title.

McEldowney plays his club football and hurling for Robert Emmet's Slaughtneil, with whom he won three Derry Senior Football Championship and Derry Senior Hurling Championship. His twin brother Fergal also played for Derry in the past.

Playing career

Inter-county
2004 was McEldowney's debut year and was ever-present for Derry in that year's Championship.

He was part of the Derry team that won the 2008 National League where Derry beat Kerry in the final.

Club
McEldowney's underage honours include two Derry Minor Football Championship's and two Derry Minor Hurling Championship's. In 2000 he won a Derry Senior Hurling Championship with the club. They were also beaten in that year's Ulster Senior Club Hurling Championship final. In 2004 McEldowney was part of the first ever Slaughtneil side to win the Derry Senior Football Championship. Slaughtneil were beaten finalists in the competition in 2008.

Honours

Football
Derry
National Football League (1): 2008

Slaughtneil
Ulster Senior Club Football Championship (1): 2014
Derry Senior Football Championship (2): 2004, 2014
Derry Senior Football League (1): 2001
Derry Minor Football Championship (2): 1998, 1999

Hurling
Slaughtneil
Derry Senior Hurling Championship (1): 2000
Derry Minor Hurling Championship (2): 1998, 1999

References

External links
Player profiles on Official Derry GAA website
Slaughneil GAC website

Living people
1981 births
Derry inter-county Gaelic footballers
Derry hurlers
Dual players
Slaughtneil Gaelic footballers
Slaughtneil hurlers
Twin sportspeople
Irish twins